Pussy Galore is a character from the James Bond novel and film Goldfinger. It may also refer to:

 Pussy Galore (band),  a rock group
 "Pussy Galore", a song on the 2002 album Phrenology (album) by the Philadelphia hip hop band The Roots